Bruce Kreutzer is an American basketball coach and former player, currently working as an assistant coach for the Charlotte Hornets of the National Basketball Association (NBA).

Coaching career
Kreutzer served as an assistant coach at Queens University – reaching the NCAA Division II Final Four in 2003 – and UNC Charlotte. He also has been head coach at Garinger High School where he won the 4A Boys State High School title in 1989 and then served as head coach at Massanutten Military Academy (Woodstock, Virginia), leading his team to a No. 9 ranking nationally in 2006 and developing more than 20 NCAA Division I college players during his tenure. In total, Kreutzer amassed more than 300 wins at the high school and prep levels.

In 2006, Kreutzer joined former Charlotte Hornets assistant coach and four-time NBA All-Star Mark Price to form the Mark Price Shooting Lab at the Suwanee Sports Academy in Atlanta, where he served as lead shooting instructor and player development coach. Kruetzer's professional experience also includes serving as the head coach of the ABA’s Atlanta Vision (2006-2008), where the team won the Southern Division and made an Elite Eight appearance.

NBA 
Kreutzer also served as a shooting consultant for the NBA D-League (2008-2011) and the Philadelphia 76ers (2008-2010).

On July 2, 2015, Kreutzer signed with the Charlotte Hornets to become an assistant coach.

References

External links 
Coach information at Basketball-reference.com

1950 births
Living people
American men's basketball coaches
American men's basketball players
Charlotte 49ers men's basketball coaches
Charlotte Hornets assistant coaches
High school basketball coaches in the United States
New Paltz Hawks men's basketball players
Orlando Magic assistant coaches
Point guards